= TVpad =

Chinese Android Based TV Box

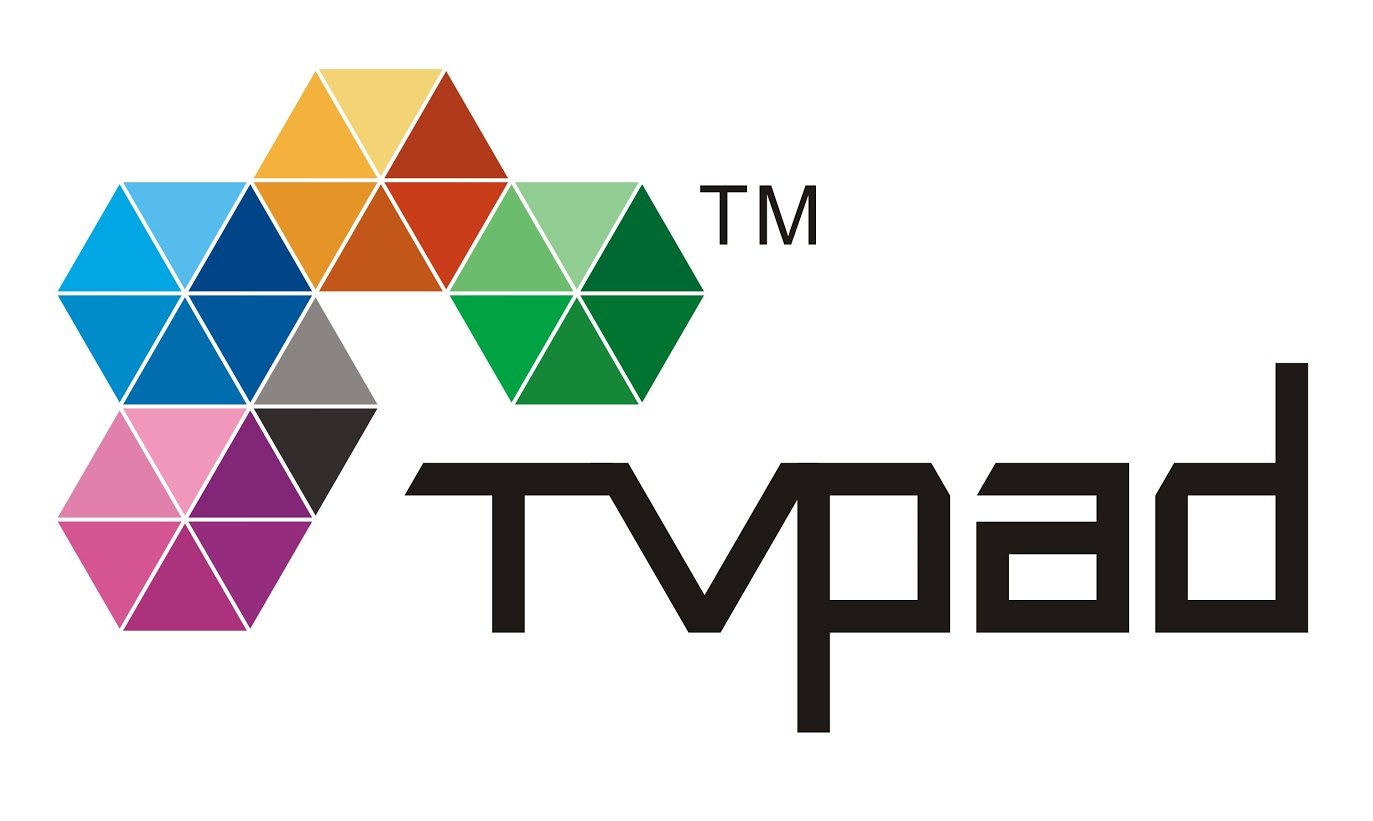
Logo of TVpad

TVpad was a series of set-top box devices that connected television to various Asian channels. It used a broadband connection and used a version of Android as the operating system. TVpad's main market was Chinese consumers worldwide. The label on an M358 device identifies the manufacturer as Create New Technology (HK) Limited.

TVpad ended service in 2017, following a lawsuit from various television broadcasters.

== Versions ==
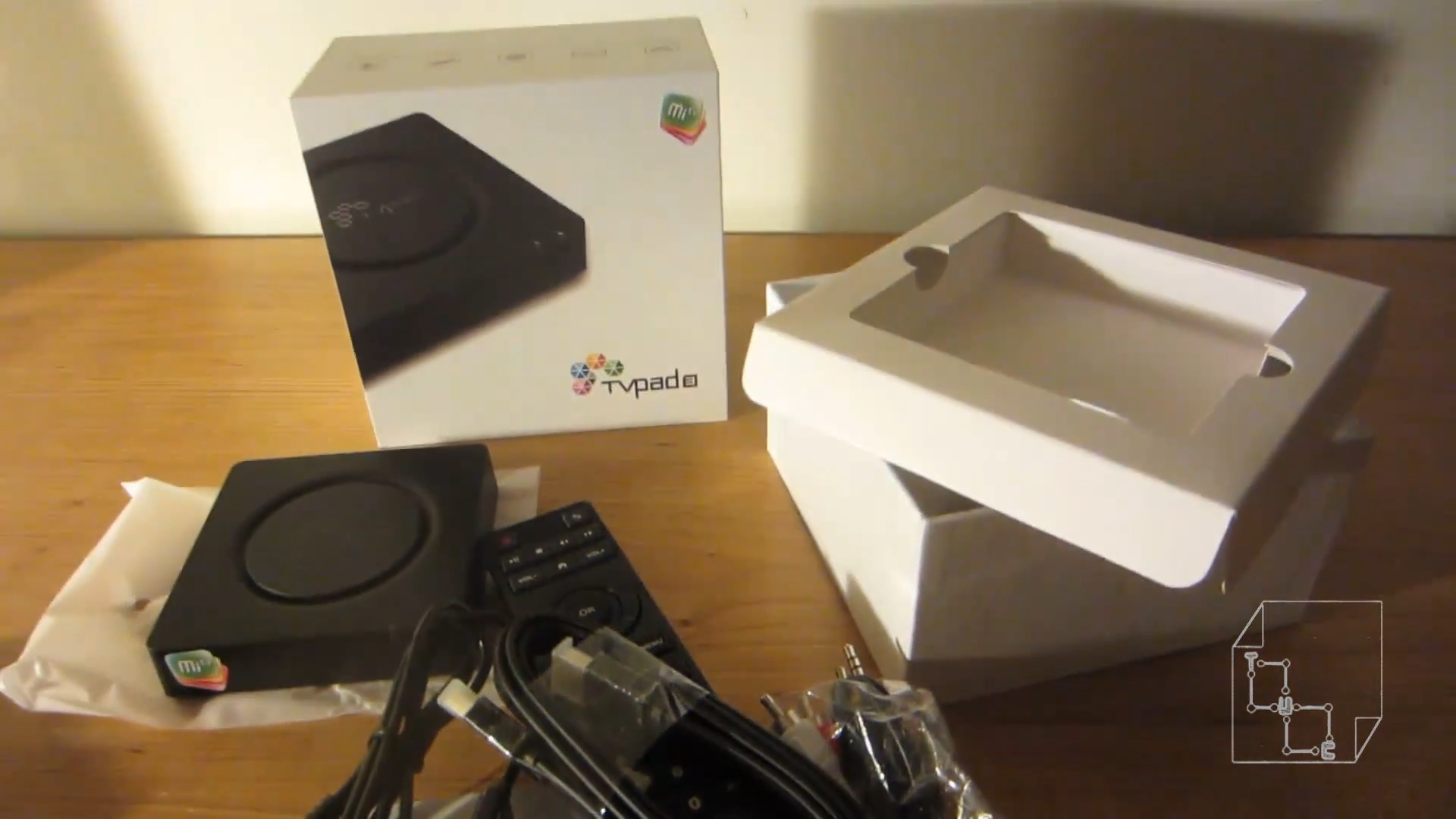
Photo of packaging and contents of the TVpad 3

There were four generations of TVpads:

- TVpad: M121S, M121 and M120
- TVpad 2: M233
- TVpad 3: M358
- TVpad 4: M418

There were two editions of M418: CN and GCN. CN edition was tailored for mandarin-speaking overseas Chinese.

== Hardware Specifications ==
TVPad2: M233

- CPU: TCC892x (ARM Cortex-A5) processor
- ARM instruction set: ARMv7
- Chipset TCC8920 ???
- RAM 377MB
- ROM 4G onboard eMMC NAND storage
- Extended memory Supports external 8GB microSD
- Output port HDMI / AV
- Power DC 5V, P<5W, P(Standby)<0.5W
- USB port USB2.0
- Firmware 3.94

TVpad3: M358

- CPU TCC8925 Single Core
- RAM 512MB
- ROM 4GB
- Extended memory Supports external 8GB TF-card
- Output port HDMI / AV
- Power DC 5V, P<5W, P(Standby)<0.5W
- USB port USB2.0
- Firmware M358
- Internet Ethernet port and Built-in WiFi
- Required Internet 2MB/S
- Operating System Android 3.70
- Max video resolution Up to 1920 x 1080 pixels at 60 Hz
- Picture formats JPEG, PNG
- Video encoding MPEG-1/2/4, H.264, WMV7/8/9, DivX, Xvid, RV10/20/30/40 etc.
- Video formats AVI, VOB, WMV, H.264, RMVB suffixes and more
- Size 104 x 104 x 28mm

== Lawsuit ==
In June of 2014, the Korean broadcasters MBC, SBS and KBS filed a lawsuit under American jurisdiction; against the company behind the device, citing violations of the Digital Millennium Copyright Act. The ruling was in the broadcasters favor.

On March 13, 2015, Chinese broadcaster CCTV, Hong Kong broadcaster TVB, and American television provider Dish Network filed a complaint in the United States District Court of California alleging: Direct Copyright Infringement, Secondary Copyright Infringement, Trademark Infringement, Unfair Competition, and Violation of Business and Professions Code 17200. By late 2015, content from the broadcasters were restricted from distribution.

TVPad4 stopped streaming on July 15, 2017.
